Balboa Park may refer to:

 Balboa Park (San Diego), an urban park in San Diego, California
 Balboa Park, San Francisco, a public park in San Francisco, California
 Balboa Park station, a San Francisco train station
 Anthony C. Beilenson Park, formerly Balboa Park, in the Lake Balboa neighborhood of Los Angeles, California
 Balboa Park, in the Panchimalco district of San Salvador, El Salvador
 "Balboa Park", a song by Bruce Springsteen on his 1995 album The Ghost of Tom Joad